The 2009 CSUB Roadrunners baseball team represented California State University, Bakersfield in the NCAA Division I baseball season of 2009.  The 2009 season was the inaugural season for the Roadrunners in baseball, with CSUB beginning the transition from Division II to Division I in 2006, launching baseball in 2009, and completing the transition and eligible for the post season in 2011.  A new stadium, Hardt Field, was built on the CSUB campus during the off-season and opened on opening day of the 2009 season.

The team was managed by Bill Kernen.

Pre-season
In June 2006, CSUB president Horace Mitchell announced that CSUB would be moving to Division I, and entering a four-year reclassification process, which would require additional funds for the creation of a new baseball program.

In August, 2008, before the schedule for Cal State Bakersfield's inaugural baseball season was released, coach Bill Kernen confirmed that the Roadrunners would play six games against Fresno State, the defending College World Series champion. August 2008 also marked the groundbreaking of CSUB's Hardt Field, construction of which was completed in 28 weeks.  The Roadrunners strength of schedule (SOS) was ranked an astounding 19th in the country.

Regular season
CSUB entered the 2009 Baseball season with a competitive schedule, competing against multiple teams ranked in the top 30 in Collegiate Baseball poll, along with the 2008 National Champion Fresno State Bulldogs. CSUB opened the season at home against the St. Louis Billikens, in a three-game series which marked the first winning series for the Roadrunners, finishing 2–1 in the series. The second team faced by the Roadrunners was the UC Santa Barbara Gauchos, ranked #30 in the Collegiate Baseball poll, which resulted in a 10–0 loss.

The 2009 Season found the team getting off to a .500 start in their first 6 games, including victories over St. Louis and Utah. However, after getting off to a good start, the Roadrunners went 1–14 in the month of March. During the course of the month, the Roadrunners met several in-state opponents, including San Jose State, St. Mary's, and San Francisco.  The 'Runners also cemented a rivalry with the nearby Cal Poly Mustangs. The 'Runners also met their valley rivals, the Fresno State Bulldogs, winning one game of the three game series played in Beiden Field, and winning the first game of the homestand in a come from behind win, by a score of 17–12. The Roadrunners' 4-3 victory over the Bulldogs on April 4 marked the first time that a first-year NCAA Division I baseball program defeated the defending College World Series champions.

Roster

Coaches

Players (Inaugural Roster, 2009)

Schedule and results

|- align="center" bgcolor="#FFE6E6"
| 1 || February 20 ||  || 7–8 || Hardt Field || Turmail (1–0) || Jannis (0–1) || || 900 || 0–1
|- align="center" bgcolor="#D8FFEB"
| 2 || February 21 || Saint Louis || 4–2 || Hardt Field || Draxton (1–0) || Sever (0–1) || Medina (1) || 500 || 1–1
|- align="center" bgcolor="#D8FFEB"
| 3 || February 21 || Saint Louis || 8–4 || Hardt Field || Montoya (1–0) || Buckham (0–1) || || 500 || 2–1
|- align="center" bgcolor="FFE6E6"
| 4 || February 22 || #30  || 0–10 || Hardt Field || Hollands (1–0) || Jones (0–1) ||  || 629 || 2–2
|- align="center" bgcolor="FFE6E6"
| 5 || February 22 ||  || 1–12 || Hardt Field || Budrow (1–0) || Jannis (0–2) ||  || 365 || 2–3
|- align="center" bgcolor="#D8FFEB"
| 7 || February 28 || Utah || 10–8 || Hardt Field || Kudlock (1–0) || Askew (0–1) || Medina (2) || 514 || 3–3
|- align="center" bgcolor="FFE6E6"
| 8 || February 28 || Utah || 6–7 || Hardt Field || Streich (1–0) || Medina (0–1) ||  || 514 || 3–4
|- align="center" bgcolor="#FFE6E6"
| 9 || March 9 ||  || 6–7 || Beiden Field || Anderson (2–2) || Messmore (0–1) ||  ||  || 3–5
|- align="center" bgcolor="#FFE6E6"
| 10 || March 10 ||  || 1–16 || Beiden Field || Benny (1–1) || Draxton (1–1) || Morse (1) || 2017 || 3–6
|- align="center" bgcolor="#D8FFEB"
| 11 || March 11 ||  || 9–7 || Beiden Field || Montoya (2–0) || Varce (1–3) || Valenzuela (1) || || 4–6
|- align="center" bgcolor="FFE6E6"
| 13 || March 12 || Buffalo || 10–23 || Beiden Field || Ciesla(1–1) || Medina (0–2) ||  ||  || 4–7
|- align="center" bgcolor="#FFE6E6"
| 14 || March 13 || Fresno State || 2–3 || Beiden Field || Sprague (2–0) || Branske (0–1) || Bischoff (1) || 2575 || 4–9
|- align="center" bgcolor="#FFE6E6"
| 15 || March 14 || Portland || 6–10 || Beiden Field || Brynteson (1–0) || Branske (0–2) ||  ||  || 4–10
|- align="center" bgcolor="#FFE6E6"
| 16 || March 20 ||  || 2–6 || Baggett Stadium || Eskew (4–1) || Jannis (0–3) ||  || 1012 || 4–11
|- align="center" bgcolor="#FFE6E6"
| 17 || March 21 || Cal Poly || 3–15 || Baggett Stadium || Leonard (3–0) || Draxton (1–2) || Radeke (1) || 1063 || 4–12
|- align="center" bgcolor="#FFE6E6"
| 18 || March 22 || Cal Poly || 2–10 || Hardt Field || Mauldin (3–1) || Montoya (2–1) ||  || 638 || 4–13
|- align="center" bgcolor="#FFE6E6"
| 19 || March 23 || Cal Poly || 15–18 || Hardt Field || DeVincenzi (2–0) || Jones (0–3) || Massingham (2) || 398 || 4–14
|- align="center" bgcolor="#FFE6E6"
| 20 || March 27 ||  || 4–8 || Municipal Stadium || Berner (5–0) || Jannis (0–4) ||  || 401 || 4–15
|- align="center" bgcolor="#FFE6E6"
| 21 || March 28 || San Jose State || 10–13 || Municipal Stadium || Peterson (5–0) || Montoya (2–2) ||  || 535 || 4–16
|- align="center" bgcolor="#FFE6E6"
| 22 || March 29 || San Jose State || 2–17 || Municipal Stadium || Sobczak (4–0) || Van Dam (0–1) ||  || 420 || 4–17
|- align="center" bgcolor="#FFE6E6"
| 23 || March 30 ||  || 1–3 || Louis Guisto Field || Reid (2–3) || Draxton (1–3) || Berl (4) || 88 || 4–18
|- align="center" bgcolor="#FFE6E6"
| 24 || April 1 ||  || 4–5 || Hardt Field || Oropeza (1–1) || Jones (0–4) || Mott (1) || 299 || 4–19
|- align="center" bgcolor="#FFE6E6"
| 25 || April 3 || Fresno State || 8–9 || Beiden Field || Kendall (1–0) || Jannis (0–5) || Sprague (1) || 1951 || 4–20
|- align="center" bgcolor="#D8FFEB"
| 26 || April 4 || Fresno State || 4–3 || Beiden Field || Montoya (3–2) || Garrison (4–2) ||  || 2036 || 5–20
|- align="center" bgcolor="#FFE6E6"
| 27 || April 5 || Fresno State || 2–9 || Beiden Field || Sprague (3–0) || Draxton (1–4) ||  || 2158 || 5–21
|- align="center" bgcolor="#D8FFEB"
| 28 || April 7 || Fresno State || 17–12 || Hardt Field || Messmore (1–1) || Bischoff (1–4) ||  || 707 || 6–21
|- align="center" bgcolor="#D8FFEB"
| 29 || April 8 || Fresno State || 3–2 || Hardt Field || Medina (1–2) || Escat (0–1) ||  || 704 || 7–21
|- align="center" bgcolor="#FFE6E6"
| 30 || April 9 ||  || 2–10 || Hardt Field || Bargas (4–2) || Jannis (0–6) ||  || 369 || 7–22
|- align="center" bgcolor="#FFE6E6"
| 31 || April 10 || UC Riverside || 1–6 || Hardt Field || Andriese (3–1) || Montoya (3–3) ||  || 347 || 7–23
|- align="center" bgcolor="#D8FFEB"
| 32 || April 11 || UC Riverside || 9–7 || Hardt Field || Medina (1–2) || Dickey (3–3) ||  || 493 || 8–23
|- align="center" bgcolor="#FFE6E6"
| 33 || April 14 ||  || 1–3 || Matador Field || Tremlin (4–1) || Van Dam (1–1) || Slover (4) || 137 || 8–24
|- align="center" bgcolor="#FFE6E6"
| 34 || April 15 || UC Santa Barbara || 7–8 || Caesar Uyesaka Stadium || Ford (4–3) || Draxton (1–5) ||  || 126 || 8–25
|- align="center" bgcolor="#FFE6E6"
| 35 || April 21 || UC Santa Barbara || 2–17 || Hardt Field || Meaux (3–0) || Draxton (1–6) ||  || 341 || 8–26
|- align="center" bgcolor="#FFE6E6"
| 36 || April 24 ||  || 6–7 || Peccole Park || Graham (2–2) || Messmore (1–2) ||  || 588 || 8–27
|- align="center" bgcolor="#FFE6E6"
| 37 ||  April 25 || Nevada || 4–9 || Peccole Park || Garcia (3–4) || Montoya (3–4) ||  || 675 || 8–28
|- align="center" bgcolor="#FFE6E6"
| 38 || April 26 || Nevada || 6–13 || Peccole Park || Achelpohl  (4–3) || Jannis (0–7) ||  || 904 || 8–29
|-align="center" bgcolor="#D8FFEB"
| 39 || April 28 || UC Santa Barbara || 8–6 || Caesar Uyesaka Stadium || Messmore (2–2) || Meals (2–2) ||  || 203 || 9–29
|- align="center" bgcolor="#FFE6E6"
| 40 || April 29 ||  || 2–13 || Hardt Field || McClintick (4–1) || Van Dam (0–3) || || 384 || 9–30
|- align="center" bgcolor="#FFE6E6"
| 41 || May 5 || UCLA || 2–15 || Jackie Robinson Stadium || Claypool  (2–1) || Montoya (3–5) ||  || 531 || 9–31
|- align="center" bgcolor="#FFE6E6"
| 42 || May 8 ||  || 6–9 || Hawks Field || Nesseth (4–4) || Medina (2–3) || || 2853 || 9–32
|-align="center" bgcolor="#D8FFEB"
| 43 || May 9 || Nebraska || 10–8 || Hawks Field || Jannis (1–7) || Rose (1–3) ||  || 2527 || 10–32
|-align="center" bgcolor="#D8FFEB"
| 44 || May 10 || Nebraska || 8–7 || Hawks Field || Montoya (4–5) || Yost (1–5) || Draxton (1) || 1832 || 11–32
|-

Rankings

The 'Runners have yet to be ranked, and are ineligible for the post season until 2011.

Awards and honors
Erik Draxton and Jason Kudlock were selected to the All-Independent Academic Team in 2009. Erik Draxton had a 3.42 gpa in Business Administration. Jason Kudlock had a 3.38 gpa in Psychology.

Major League Baseball Draft

In CSUB's first year of eligible draftees, the first three baseball players in CSUB's short history (2nd year) were selected in the 2010 MLB Draft. Zach Arneson was selected by the San Francisco Giants in the 21st round as the 648th pick. Jason Kudlock was selected by the Texas Rangers in the 36th round as the 1096th pick. Finally, Mickey Jannis was selected by the Tampa Bay Rays as the 1331th pick.

References

External links
CSUB Baseball Schedule @ GoRunners.com
CSUB Baseball Roster @ GoRunners.com

Cal State Bakersfield Roadrunners baseball seasons
Cal State Bakersfield